Brevig Mission Airport  is a state-owned public-use airport located in Brevig Mission, a city in the Nome Census Area of the U.S. state of Alaska.

As per Federal Aviation Administration records, this airport had 2,696 passenger boardings (enplanements) in calendar year 2007, a decrease of 14% from the 3,152 enplanements in 2006.

Facilities 
It has two gravel surfaced runways: 11/29 is 3,000 by 100 feet (914 x 30 m); 4/22 is 2,110 by 75 feet (643 x 23 m).

Airlines and destinations 

Prior to its bankruptcy and cessation of all operations, Ravn Alaska served the airport from multiple locations.

Statistics

References

External links 
 FAA Alaska airport diagram (GIF)
 
 
 

Airports in the Nome Census Area, Alaska